A distributed data store is a computer network where information is stored on more than one node, often in a replicated fashion. It is usually specifically used to refer to either a distributed database where users store information on a number of nodes, or a computer network in which users store information on a number of peer network nodes.

Distributed databases
Distributed databases are usually non-relational databases that enable a quick access to data over a large number of nodes. Some distributed databases expose rich query abilities while others are limited to a key-value store semantics. Examples of limited distributed databases are Google's Bigtable, which is much more than a distributed file system or a peer-to-peer network, Amazon's Dynamo
and Microsoft Azure Storage.

As the ability of arbitrary querying is not as important as the availability, designers of distributed data stores have increased the latter at an expense of consistency. But the high-speed read/write access results in reduced consistency, as it is not possible to guarantee both consistency and availability on a partitioned network, as stated by the CAP theorem.

Peer network node data stores
In peer network data stores, the user can usually reciprocate and allow other users to use their computer as a storage node as well. Information may or may not be accessible to other users depending on the design of the network.

Most peer-to-peer networks do not have distributed data stores in that the user's data is only available when their node is on the network. However, this distinction is somewhat blurred in a system such as BitTorrent, where it is possible for the originating node to go offline but the content to continue to be served. Still, this is only the case for individual files requested by the redistributors, as contrasted with networks such as Freenet, Winny, Share and Perfect Dark where any node may be storing any part of the files on the network.

Distributed data stores typically use an error detection and correction technique.
Some distributed data stores (such as Parchive over NNTP) use forward error correction techniques to recover the original file when parts of that file are damaged or unavailable.
Others try again to download that file from a different mirror.

Examples

Distributed non-relational databases

Peer network node data stores
 BitTorrent
 Blockchain (database)
 Chord project
 Freenet
 GNUnet
 IPFS
 Mnet
 Napster
 NNTP (the distributed data storage protocol used for Usenet news)
 Unity, of the software Perfect Dark
 Share
 Siacoin
 DeNet
 Storage@home
 STORJ
 Tahoe-LAFS
 Winny
 ZeroNet

See also

 Cooperative storage cloud
 Data store
 Distributed file system
 Keyspace, the DDS schema
 Peer-to-peer
 Distributed hash table
 Distributed cache
 Cyber Resilience

References

Data management
 
 

ja:分散ファイルシステム#分散データストア